Mass Leader is a 2017 Indian Kannada-language action thriller film written and directed by Narasimha, and produced jointly by Tarun Shivappa and Hardik Gowda. It features Shiva Rajkumar, Pranitha Subhash and Vamsi Krishna in the lead roles whilst Vijay Raghavendra, Yogesh, Gururaj Jaggesh, Sharmiela Mandre, Ashika Ranganath and Parinitha Kitty in key supporting roles. The soundtrack and score for the film is composed by Veer Samarth and the cinematography is by Guru Prashant Rai.

Plot
Bangladeshi infiltrators are thriving in Karnataka and other countries around India with the help of the politicians, who practice vote-bank politics. CM Sudarshan's brother Suyodhana takes the help of a terrorist named Rafiq to bring Bangladeshi infiltrators to cast their vote, in order to become MP, but is stopped by Shivraj and his associates Vijay aka Viji and Guru. They kill Suyodhana, earning the wrath of Sudarshan and also take actions against the crime syndicates and other illegal activities. 

Azim, a Mangalore contract killer is tasked by Rafiq to kill Shivraj, but is double-crossed by his men and reunites with his mother, who is living with Shivaraj as his daughter Chummi's caretaker. With the help of a reporter Chandini, They successfully drives out the infiltrators by using widespread rumours that they are going to be attacked. Under orders from Pakistani terrorists, Rafiq plant a bomb at Chummi's surgical leg to kill Shivaraj, but Azim and his mother get killed in the blast. In a flashback, Shivraj was an INA Captain in Kashmir with a loving wife Deepa, parents and sister Shreya. Shreya is in relationship with Harshath, who is actually a terrorist and uses Shreya to spy on Shivaraj. 

Shivaraj is assigned to escort Central Minister Virendra Hegde to Amarnath temple where his family is also escorted in Hegde's convoy, but the convoy is destroyed leaving Chummi handicapped. Shivaraj, with his team sneak into Harshath's hideout where they learn that their superior Pratap Sinha is the mole in the INA. A shootout ensues where Shivaraj and his team eliminate the terrorists, but Harshath escapes. In the present, Shivaraj, Viji and Guru are actually working incognito for the Indian Army where they track down Harshath and manages to kill him and his men.

Cast
 Shiva Rajkumar as INA Captain Shivraj
 Pranitha Subhash as Deepa
 Vijay Raghavendra as INA officer Vijay aka Viji
 Gururaj Jaggesh as INA officer Guru
 Yogesh as Azim
 Vamsi Krishna as Harshath
 Sharmiela Mandre as Chandini, a reporter
 Ashika Ranganath as Shreya 
 Parinitha Kitty as Chummi
 Prakash Belawadi as Chief Minister Sudarshan
 Chi. Guru Dutt as Police Commissioner

Production 
The film was officially launched on 19 April 2016 in Bangalore. Apart from various locations in Karnataka and Andhra Pradesh, the principal photography took place in Kashmir amidst heavy snow fall. The crew shifted the shoot to Manali after tensions erupted in Kashmir in January 2017.

Soundtrack

Veer Samarth was signed to compose the film's music, making his 25th film. The soundtrack was released on 9 July 2017, with the Telugu actor Nandamuri Balakrishna officially launching the audio.

References

External links
 
 

2017 films
2010s Kannada-language films
2017 crime action films
Indian crime action films
India–Pakistan relations in popular culture
Films about organised crime in India
Indian gangster films
Indian action thriller films
Films shot in Jammu and Kashmir
2017 action thriller films
Films about corruption in India
Indian nonlinear narrative films
2010s masala films
Films shot in Bangalore
Films set in Bangalore
Films set in Bangladesh
Films about terrorism in India
Indian films about revenge
Films set in Jammu and Kashmir